Inga pedunculata is a species of plant in the family Fabaceae. It is found only in Brazil.

References

pedunculata
Flora of Brazil
Endangered plants
Taxonomy articles created by Polbot